Alexandra de Alvarenga Solnado is a Portuguese writer who has published several books about spirituality. She has also worked as an actress and singer. Currently she is the director of the project Therapy for the Soul.

Biography 
Alexandra Solnado is the daughter of Raul Solnado and Joselita Alvarenga. She has a daughter, Joana and a son, Gabriel. She has lived in Portugal and Brazil.
As an actress, she participated in the movies Há Petróleo no Beato (1986) and Lisboa, Tejo e Tudo (1993).

Alexandra Solnado claimed she saw Jesus Christ in her meditations for the first time in 2002. According to her Jesus then started to dictate his messages and teachings to her on a regular basis and she published them in her books.

Published books 

A Entrega, Editorial Angelorum, 2003 (segunda edição: Pergaminho, 2005)
Translated title: Deliverance

A Lógica do Céu e a Lógica da Terra, Editorial Angelorum, 2004 (segunda edição: Pergaminho, 2007)
Translated title: The Logic of Heaven vs The Logic of The Earth

O Eu Superior e Outras Lições de Vida, “Editorial Angelorum, 2004 (incluides CD)
Translated title: My Higher Self and Other Lessons on Life (Includes CD)

 Era da Liberdade, Pergaminho, 2005
Translated title: The Age of Freedom

A Minha Limpeza Espiritual, Pergaminho, 2005 (incluides CD)
Translated title: My Spiritual Cleansing (Includes CD)

A Alma Iluminada, Pergaminho, 2006
Translated title: The Enlightened Soul

O Livro da Luz, Pergaminho, 2007 (reúne os títulos Luz, Mais Luz e Muito Mais Luz)
Translated title: The Book of Light, Atria Books, 2011 (trilogy that brings together the books Light, More Light and Even More Light)

CD Luz, Pergaminho, 2008 (inclui CD)
Translated title: CD Light (Includes CD)

Voo Sensitivo, A História de Um Mergulho Espiritual, Pergaminho, 2010
Translated title: Sensitive Flight, The Story of a Spiritual Diving

Bom Karma – O Melhor das Vidas, Pergaminho, 2012
Translated title: Good Karma – The Best of Lives

Há Mil Anos Que Não Te Via, Pergaminho, 2014 (Romance)
Translated title: Haven't Seen You in a Thousand Years (Novel)

References

External links 
 Alexandra Solnado – Therapy for the Soul official American website
 Projecto Alexandra Solnado official Portuguese website
 Alexandra Solnado (in English) in The Internet Movie Database

Portuguese women writers
Portuguese astrologers
Folk healers
Portuguese actresses
Living people
21st-century astrologers
Year of birth missing (living people)